The Tarija akodont (Akodon pervalens), or Tarija grass mouse, is a species in the family Cricetidae native to Bolivia, and possibly Argentina.

References

Akodon
Mammals of Bolivia
Mammals described in 2000